Guillermo Cañas was the defending champion, but chose not to participate that year.

Nicolás Almagro won in the final 7–6(7–4), 3–6, 7–5, against Carlos Moyá.

Seeds

Draw

Finals

Top half

Bottom half

External links
 Draw
 Qualifying draw

Singles